Api is the highest peak in the Yoka Pahar Section of Gurans Himal, part of the Himalayas in the extreme northwest corner of Nepal, near the border with Tibet. It is a little-known peak in a rarely visited part of the Himalayas, but it rises dramatically over the low surrounding terrain.

Notable features
Although low in elevation among the major mountains of Nepal, Api is exceptional in its rise above local terrain; the surrounding valleys are significantly lower than those surrounding most higher Himalayan peaks.

Climbing history
The Api region was visited by Westerners in 1899, 1905 and 1936, but the peak was not attempted until 1953 on a visit by W. H. Murray a Scottish Mountaineer with John Tyson. This attempt was unsuccessful, as was another, by Italians, in 1954 which resulted in the death of two expedition members.

The first ascent of Api occurred in 1960. The Doshisha Alpine Society of Japan successfully completed the Northwest Face route attempted by the 1954 party.

In 1980, a British Army Mountaineering Association expedition made an attempt to climb the peak by the south face reaching within a few hundred metres of the summit.

On 24 December 1983, Polish climbers Tadeusz Piotrowski and Andrzej Bieluń made the first winter ascent. Bieluń had reached the summit first alone but did not return to camp.

The Himalayan Index lists three more ascents of the peak, in 1978, 1996, and 2001.

References

Seven-thousanders of the Himalayas
Mountains of the Sudurpashchim Province